"Warsaw" is the opening song on the EP An Ideal for Living, written and performed by Joy Division. It was slated for release on the album that became Warsaw, which was originally scrapped by the band and not released until 1994. The song appears to be a somewhat fantastical biography of Rudolf Hess, Hitler's Deputy Führer, who flew to Great Britain in 1941 in an attempt to negotiate a peace between Germany and the UK, supposedly because of his disillusionment with National Socialism.

Composition
The song starts with the mock-countoff "3 5 0 1 2 5 Go!"; "31G-350125" was Hess's prisoner of war serial number when he was captured after flying to Eaglesham, Scotland during World War II. 

The first verse describes Hess's involvement with Hitler in the Beer Hall Revolution and his infatuation with the NSDAP. The second verse discusses his supposed disillusionment with it, and the last verse portrays his life in prison after being convicted at the Nuremberg Trials. The chorus is a simple repetition of "31G", the first three characters of his serial number. "31" signifies the European theatre of war and "G" German, the nationality of the prisoner.

Other versions
The song is available on a number of compilations, including Substance. At a performance of the song "At a Later Date" at the Electric Circus in Manchester, Guitarist Bernard Sumner shouts "You all forgot Rudolph Hess" before the song begins.

"Warsaw" is featured in the video game Tony Hawk's Underground 2.

References 

Joy Division songs
1978 songs
Songs written by Bernard Sumner
Songs written by Peter Hook
Songs written by Stephen Morris (musician)
Songs written by Ian Curtis